"Young Man Blues" is a song by jazz artist Mose Allison. Allison first recorded it in March 1957 for his debut album, Back Country Suite, in which it appears under the title "Back Country Suite: Blues." In Allison's two-CD compilation set of 2002, Allison Wonderland, Allison reveals that the tune's full title is: "Back Country Suite: Blues (a.k.a. 'Young Man's Blues')".

The Who version

The song was famously covered by the Who during live sets as early as 1964, but it became a regular inclusion between 1968 and 1970. It first appeared on record on their 1970 album Live at Leeds. Allison himself called this the "Command Performance" version of his song. The single reached #38 in Canada. Another live performance features in the movie and soundtrack for The Kids Are Alright, from a 1969 performance at the London Coliseum. A live performance from 1970 was used in the documentary Message to Love. They brought it back briefly in 1974, again in 1982 and finally in 2002. The song was included in Rock Band 2 as downloadable content.

Other covers
It has also been covered live by You Am I, Joe Bonamassa, Foo Fighters, The Bright Light Social Hour and Motorpsycho.

The tune is also found on Chris Spedding's 2009 reissued album One Step Ahead of the Blues, where in the liner notes Spedding states he was trying make a version which was how he imagined Allison originally recorded it; having never heard it. Spedding's blues rock version differs considerably from either Allison's jazz-blues or the Who's rock versions.

References

The Who songs
American jazz songs